The year 2015 was the 2nd year in the history of the Kunlun Fight, a kickboxing promotion based in China. 2015 started with Kunlun Fight 15 and ended with Kunlun Fight 35.

The events were broadcasts through television agreements in mainland China with Jiangsu TV and around the world with various other channels. The events were also streamed live on the Kunlun Fight app. Traditionally, most Kunlun Fight events have both tournament fights and superfights (single fights).

Champions

List of events

Kunlun Fight 15

Results

70kg World Max Group A tournament bracket

Kunlun Fight 16

Results

70kg World Max Group B tournament bracket

70kg World Max Group C tournament bracket

Kunlun Fight 17

Results

70kg World Max Group D tournament bracket

70kg World Max Group E tournament bracket

Kunlun Fight 18

Results

Kunlun Fight 19

Results

70kg World Max Group F tournament bracket

Kunlun Fight 20

Results

70kg World Max Group G tournament bracket

Kunlun Fight 21

Results

70kg World Max Group H tournament bracket

Kunlun Fight - Cage Fight Series 2

Results

Kunlun Fight 22

Results

Kunlun Fight 23

Results

Kunlun Fight 24

Results

Kunlun Fight 25

Results

70kg World Max Group I tournament bracket

Kunlun Fight - Cage Fight Series 3

Results

Kunlun Fight 26

Results

Super Heavyweight Tournament 2015 bracket

70kg World Max Group J tournament bracket

Kunlun Fight 27

Results

70kg World Max Group K tournament bracket

Kunlun Fight 28

Results

70kg World Max Group L tournament bracket

Kunlun Fight 29

Results

70kg World Max Group M tournament bracket

Kunlun Fight 30 / Topking World Series: TK5

Results

Kunlun Fight 31

Results

Kunlun Fight - Cage Fight Series 4

Results

Kunlun Fight 32

Results

Female 52kg Tournament 2015 bracket

Kunlun Fight 33

Results

Kunlun Fight 34

Results

75kg tournament bracket

Kunlun Fight 35

Results

80kg Tournament 2015 bracket

See also
List of Kunlun Fight events
2015 in Glory
2015 in K-1

References

External links
 http://www.kunlunjue.com/portal/page/index/id/32.html
 http://www.tapology.com/search?term=KUNLUN&mainSearchFilter=events

2015 in kickboxing
Kickboxing in China
Kunlun Fight events
2015 in Chinese sport